Prospero Caffarelli (died 14 February 1500) was an Italian Roman Catholic bishop. From 11 December 1463 until his death he was bishop of Ascoli Piceno.

References

External links and additional sources
 (for Chronology of Bishops)
 (for Chronology of Bishops)

15th-century Italian Roman Catholic bishops
1500 deaths